Pind Begwal is a village located on Simly Dam road in the Islamabad Capital Territory of Pakistan and administered by Pind Begwal Union Council.

References

Union councils of Islamabad Capital Territory
Villages in Islamabad Capital Territory